Sitacocha District is one of the four districts of the province Cajabamba in Peru.

See also 
 Yawarqucha

References